Ban Huai Khwang station is a railway station located in Huai Yai Subdistrict, Bang Lamung District, Chonburi Province.

References 

Railway stations in Thailand
Chonburi province